Williams School in Cameron, Oklahoma was a Works Progress Administration project that was built in 1936.  It was listed on the National Register of Historic Places in 1988.

It was deemed significant for its character (in architecture), for its construction having provided jobs for destitute laborers "close to the edge of starvation", for providing a better learning environment, and for helping "to instill a sense of pride within the community."

It is a one-story hipped-roof  building with native sandstone walls.

Its design is from an Oklahoma State Department of Education pattern book.

See also
Summerfield School (Oklahoma)

References

School buildings on the National Register of Historic Places in Oklahoma
School buildings completed in 1936
Works Progress Administration in Oklahoma
Buildings and structures in Le Flore County, Oklahoma
National Register of Historic Places in Le Flore County, Oklahoma